Ubaid, Ebeid, Obeid, Ubayd, Ubayyid, Ubaidi, the Americanized Obade, etc., used with or without the article Al- or El-, are all romanizations of عبید, an Arabic word or name forming the diminutive form of ʿabd, meaning 'servant' or 'slave'. It is often understood as the shortened form of Ubayd Allah, meaning "small/humble servant of God".

Ubeidiya: by adding the suffix -iya (also in different spellings), the meaning becomes "place of..." (Ubaid, 'Ubayd, etc.)

People
The name as such in various spellings
 Ebeid, common Levantine or Egyptian spelling
 Obaid (name)
 Obeid (name)
 Ubayd (name)
 Ubaydul Haq (disambiguation)

Tribes and individuals
 Al-Ubaid (tribe), an Arab tribe
 Elijah Obade (born 1991), American-Lebanese basketball player

Places
 El-Obeid, a city in Sudan
 El Obeid Airport, Sudan
 Al Ubaidi, a town in Iraq
 Beit Obeid, or Beit Abid, a village in Zgharta District, in the Northern Governorate of Lebanon
 Tell al-'Ubaid, a small tell site west of Ur, Iraq
 21712 Obaid (1999 RL96), a Main-belt Asteroid

Other
 Ubaid period, a Neolithic and Chalcolithic period in Mesopotamia

See also
 Abeed, an Arabic word meaning "servant" or "slave", used as an ethnic slur for Black people
 Abyad (disambiguation), Arabic word and name meaning 'white'. Some transliterations of abyad may overlap with those of ubaid.
 Wadi al-Abyad or al-Ubayyid, wadi (valley) in Iraq
 Abadiyeh (disambiguation)
 Ubeidiya (disambiguation)
 Ubayd Allah, for the many variants of that name, based upon this one and the Arabic word for "God"
 Obadé, town in Burkina Faso (name unrelated to the Arabic word)